Florenz Regalado (October 13, 1928 – July 24, 2015) was the 14th appointment by President Corazon Aquino to be an associate justice of the Supreme Court of the Philippines from July 29, 1988 to October 13, 1998. Regalado is considered the most influential jurist and writer on Remedial Law by far, writing the most complete compendium in one volume as early as 1972.

Biography
He was born on October 13, 1928 in Concepcion, Iloilo.

He graduated Far Eastern University with an Associate in Arts degree in 1949. A year later he entered San Beda College and finished magna cum laude in 1954 at San Beda College of Law, and received his Master of Laws degree from the University of Michigan in 1963.

He remains the record holder for the highest average in the Philippine Bar Examinations, with his 1954 mark of 96.7%, where he was awarded the Memorial of Recognition. The Florenz D. Regalado Memorial Award for the top students was created in his honor.

He was a member of the Philippine Constitutional Commission of 1986 as vice-chairman for the Executive Branch committee which drafted the present Constitution of the Philippines. Before becoming Associate Justice, he served as the Dean of San Beda College of Law. His jottings on the stages of theft are considered the principal source in current jurisprudence in criminal law.

He died on July 24, 2015.

References

1928 births
2015 deaths
People from Iloilo
20th-century Filipino judges
Associate Justices of the Supreme Court of the Philippines
University of Michigan Law School alumni
San Beda University alumni
Visayan people
Members of the Philippine Constitutional Commission of 1986